Fundal height, or McDonald's rule, is a measure of the size of the uterus used to assess fetal growth and development during pregnancy. It is measured from the top of the mother's uterus to the top of the mother's pubic symphysis. Fundal height, when expressed in centimeters, roughly corresponds to gestational age in weeks between 16 and 36 weeks for a vertex fetus. When a tape measure is unavailable, finger widths are used to estimate centimeter (week) distances from a corresponding anatomical landmark. However, landmark distances from the pubic symphysis are highly variable depending on body type. In clinical practice, recording the actual fundal height measurement from the palpable top of the uterus to the superior edge of the pubic symphysis is standard practice beginning around 20 weeks gestation.

Most caregivers will record their patient's fundal height on every prenatal visit. Measuring the fundal height can be an indicator of proper fetal growth and amniotic fluid development.

Knowledge of gestational age may impact how the height is measured.

Fundal height landmarks

Shorter measure
A shorter measure can happen for one of the following reasons:
Fetus descent into the pelvis, seen normally two to four weeks before delivery
Error in estimated date of pregnancy based on first day of last menstrual period
Fetus is healthy but physically small
Oligohydramnios
Non longitudinal lie
Small for gestational age or Intrauterine Growth Restriction

Longer measure
On the other side, a longer measure can be caused by:
Twins, or other types of multiple births
Error in estimated date of conception
Fetus is healthy but physically large
Gestational diabetes causing a larger baby
Polyhydramnios
Large for gestational age
Hydatidiform Mole
Breech birth

As a pregnancy approaches its end, the fundal height will become less accurate.                      
Symphysiofundal height is more accurate at 14–32 weeks.

References

Obstetrics
Midwifery